The Type 92 torpedo was a submarine-launched torpedo used by the Imperial Japanese Navy during World War II. This type of torpedo was battery powered. It could deliver a 660-pound (300 kg) warhead at 30 knots (55 km/h) to a target 7 kilometers (3.8 nautical miles) away.

Torpedoes of Japan
World War II weapons of Japan
World War II naval weapons